is a former Japanese football player.

Playing career
Ishikawa was born in Masuda on July 2, 1979. He joined the J1 League club Sanfrecce Hiroshima as part of the youth team in 1998. However he did not play in any matches. In 2001, he moved to the Japan Football League club Otsuka Pharmaceutical (later Tokushima Vortis). He became a regular player as center back. The club won the championship two years in a row (2003-2004) and was promoted to the J2 League in 2005. Starting in 2005, he did not play as often, due to injury, and he retired at the end of the 2008 season.

Club statistics

References

External links

1979 births
Living people
Association football people from Shimane Prefecture
Japanese footballers
J1 League players
J2 League players
Japan Football League players
Sanfrecce Hiroshima players
Tokushima Vortis players
Association football defenders